The Real Housewives of Melbourne is an Australian reality television series that premiered on 23 February 2014 on Arena. It chronicles the lives of seven women - Jackie Gillies, Janet Roach, Gamble Wolfe (née Breaux), Anjali Rao, Cherry Dipietrantonio, Kyla Kirkpatrick, and Simone Elliott — in and around Melbourne as they socialize, work on their careers and spend time with their families. The cast has evolved over the five seasons that have aired to date, with past seasons also featuring Andrea Moss, Chyka Keebaugh, Gina Liano, Lydia Schivello, Pettifleur Berenger, Susie McLean, Venus Behbahani-Clark and Sally Bloomfield.

As of 12 December 2021, 59 original episodes of The Real Housewives of Melbourne have aired.

Series overview
{| class="wikitable plainrowheaders" style="text-align:center;"
|+The Real Housewives of Melbourne episodes
|-
! scope="col" style="padding: 0 8px;" colspan="2" rowspan="2"| Season
! scope="col" style="padding: 0 8px;" rowspan="2"| Episodes
! scope="col" colspan="2"| Originally aired
|-
! scope="col" style="padding: 0 8px;"| First aired
! scope="col" style="padding: 0 8px;"| Last aired
|-
| scope="row" style="background:#336699;"|
| 1
| 12
| style="padding: 0 8px;"| 
| style="padding: 0 8px;"| 
|-
| scope="row" style="background:#D0CAD7;"|
| 2
| 13
| style="padding: 0 8px;"| 
| style="padding: 0 8px;"| 
|-
| scope="row" style="background:#B7C5D0;"|
| 3
| 12
| style="padding: 0 8px;"| 
| style="padding: 0 8px;"| 
|-
| scope="row" style="background:#7699be;"|
| 4
| 12
| style="padding: 0 8px;"| 
| style="padding: 0 8px;"|  
|-
| scope="row" style="background:#94287d;"|
| 5
| 10
| style="padding: 0 8px;"| 
| style="padding: 0 8px;"| 
|}

Episodes

Season 1 (2014)

Jackie Gillies, Chyka Keebaugh, Gina Liano, Andrea Moss, Janet Roach, and Lydia Schiavello are introduced as series regulars.

Season 2 (2015)

Moss departed as a series regular. Gamble Breaux and Pettifleur Berenger joined the cast.

Season 3 (2016)

Susie McLean joined the cast.

Season 4 (2017–18)

Keebaugh, Berenger and McLean departed as series regulars. Sally Bloomfield and Venus Behbahani-Clark joined the cast.

Season 5 (2021)

Liano, Schiavello, Bloomfield and Behbahani-Clark departed as series regulars. Cherry Dipietrantonio, Anjali Rao, Simone Elliott and Kyla Kirkpatrick joined the cast.

References

External links

 
 

The Real Housewives of Melbourne
2014 Australian television series debuts
Australian reality television series
Real Housewives of Melbourne, The